Madan Lal Udhouram Sharma (born 20 March 1951) is a former Indian cricketer (1974–1987) and Indian national cricket coach. He was a member of the 1983 Cricket World Cup winning India squad.

Playing career

Madan Lal enjoyed outstanding all-round success at first-class level scoring 10,204 runs (av 42.87), including 22 hundreds, also capturing 625 wickets (av 25.50). He had a side-on bowling action.

He played 39 Test matches for India, scoring 1,042 runs at an average of 22.65, taking 71 wickets at 40.08 and holding 15 catches. He was a fairly competent lower order batsman, often extricating the Indian team from tricky situations which earned him the nickname, Maddad Lal by grateful Indian fans.

He made 67 One Day Internationals appearances and was also a member of the 1983 World Cup final winning team where he teamed up with Kapil Dev, Balwinder Sandhu, Roger Binny, Mohinder Amarnath and Kirti Azad to contain and destroy the opposition. In the 1983 world cup finale Kapil Dev took the extraordinary catch of Vivian Richards off the bowling of Madan Lal. Madan Lal played for Punjab but later played for Delhi. Madan Lal also bowled the first ball to Dennis Amiss of England in the 1975 World Cup

Coaching career 

In his retirement, Madan Lal has been actively involved in the game in various capacities. Madan Lal coached the UAE team for 1996 Cricket World Cup. Madan Lal had a stint as India's national cricket coach between September 1996 and September 1997

He was member of the Selection Committee from 2000 and 2001. He joined and served as the coach of the Delhi Giants (known as the Delhi Jets till 2008) in the Indian Cricket League till it became defunct. He later applied for BCCI's amnesty offer since the ICL was not a recognized Twenty20 League.

Madan Lal run a cricket academy in Siri Fort Sports Complex, Delhi. He was appointed as chief coach of the Sanjay Jagdale MPCA Academy in 2010.

Political career

In March 2009, the Indian National Congress decided to field Madan Lal as their candidate for the Hamirpur Parliamentary constituency bye elections in Himachal Pradesh. Madan Lal was chosen to contest the bye elections against Anurag Thakur, son of the Himachal Pradesh BJP leader, Prem Kumar Dhumal.

Acting career 

In April 2013, Madan Lal appeared on a crime show called Hum Ne Li Hai- Shapath on Life OK at 9 pm.

In popular culture
A Bollywood film titled 83 is scheduled to release in 2021 about the event of India's first world cup win at Lords. The film features  Harrdy Sandhu as Madan Lal and is directed and produced by Kabir Khan and Anurag Kashyap respectively.

References

External links
 Madan Lal’s cricket academy at Gaur City, Greater Noida (West) on realtyfact.com 
 

Indian Cricket League coaches
1951 births
Living people
India One Day International cricketers
India Test cricketers
Indian cricketers
Delhi cricketers
Punjab, India cricketers
North Zone cricketers
Cricketers at the 1975 Cricket World Cup
Cricketers at the 1983 Cricket World Cup
Indian cricket coaches
Indian cricket administrators
Cricketers from Amritsar
Coaches of the Indian national cricket team
Recipients of the Arjuna Award
India national cricket team selectors
Coaches of the United Arab Emirates national cricket team